The Norwegian Veterans' Association for International Operations (NVIO), is an organization of Norwegian veterans of military operations outside Norway, under the command of  United Nations and NATO, founded in 1961. Membership has passed 7200, and it is the largest  of the organizations for veterans in Norway.

History
Its first name was ”Norske militære FN-observatørers landsforbund”. Later this was changed to ”FN-befalets landforbund", and in 1988 it was changed again, this time to ”FN-veteranenes Landsforbund" (FNVLF) also opening up the organization for membership for regular soldiers.

References

External links
 The Norwegian Veterans Association for International Operations (NVIO)

1961 establishments in Norway
Non-profit organisations based in Norway
Organizations established in 1961
Military of Norway
Veterans' organizations